An organic superconductor is a synthetic organic compound that exhibits superconductivity at low temperatures.

In 1979 Klaus Bechgaard synthesized the first organic superconductor (TMTSF)2PF6 (the corresponding material class was named after him later) with a transition temperature of TC = 0.9 K, at an external pressure of 11 kbar.

Many materials may be characterized as organic superconductors. These include the Bechgaard salts and Fabre salts which are both quasi-one-dimensional, and quasi-two-dimensional materials such as k-BEDT-TTF2X charge-transfer complex, λ-BETS2X compounds,  graphite intercalation compounds and three-dimensional materials such as the alkali-doped fullerenes.

Organic superconductors are of special interest not only for scientists, looking for room-temperature superconductivity and for model systems explaining the origin of superconductivity but also for daily life issues as organic compounds are mainly built of carbon and hydrogen which belong to the most common elements on earth in contrast to copper or osmium.

One-dimensional Fabre and Bechgaard salts
Fabre-salts are composed of tetramethyltetrathiafulvalene (TMTTF) and Bechgaard salts of tetramethyltetraselenafulvalene (TMTSF). These two organic molecules are similar except for the sulfur-atoms of TMTTF being replaced by selenium-atoms in TMTSF. The molecules are stacked in columns (with a tendency to dimerization) which are separated by anions. Typical anions are, for example, octahedral PF6, AsF6 or tetrahedral ClO4 or ReO4.

Both material classes are quasi-one-dimensional at room-temperature, only conducting along the molecule stacks, and share a very rich phase diagram containing antiferromagnetic ordering, charge order, spin-density wave state, dimensional crossover and superconductivity.

Only one Bechgaard salt was found to be superconducting at ambient pressure which is (TMTTF)2ClO4 with a transition temperature of TC = 1.4 K. Several other salts become superconducting only under external pressure. The external pressure required to drive most Fabre-salts to superconductivity is so high, that under lab conditions superconductivity was observed only in one compound. A selection of the transition temperature and corresponding external pressure of several one-dimensional organic superconductors is shown in the table below.

Two-dimensional (BEDT-TTF)2X

BEDT-TTF is the short form of bisethylenedithio-tetrathiafulvalene commonly abbreviated with ET. These molecules form planes which are separated by anions. The pattern of the molecules in the planes is not unique but there are several different phases growing, depending on the anion and the growth conditions. Important phases concerning superconductivity are the α- and θ- phase with the molecules ordering in a fishbone structure and the β- and especially κ-phase which order in a checkerboard structure with molecules being dimerized in the κ-phase. This dimerization makes the κ-phases special as they are not quarter- but half-filled systems, driving them into superconductivity at higher temperatures compared to the other phases.

The amount of possible anions separating two sheets of ET-molecules is nearly infinite. There are simple anions such as triiodide, polymeric ones such as the very famous Cu[N(CN)2]Br and anions containing solvents for example Ag(CF3)4·112DCBE. The electronic properties of the ET-based crystals are determined by its growing phase, its anion and by the external pressure applied. The external pressure needed to drive an ET-salt with insulating ground state to a superconducting one is much less than those needed for Bechgaard salts. For example, κ-(ET)2Cu[N(CN)2]Cl needs only a pressure of about 300 bar to become superconducting, which can be achieved by placing a crystal in grease frozen below  and then providing sufficient stress to induce the superconducting transition. The crystals are very sensitive, which can be observed impressively in α-(ET)2I3 lying several hours in the sun (or more controlled in an oven at ). After this treatment one gets αTempered-(ET)2I3 which is superconducting.

In contrast to the Fabre or Bechgaard salts universal phase diagrams for all the ET-based salts have only been proposed yet. Such a phase diagram would depend not only on temperature and pressure (i.e. bandwidth), but also on electronic correlations. In addition to the superconducting ground state these materials show charge-order, antiferromagnetism or remain metallic down to lowest temperatures. One compound is even predicted to be a spin liquid.

The highest transition temperatures at ambient pressure and with external pressure are both found in κ-phases with very similar anions. κ-(ET)2Cu[N(CN)2]Br becomes superconducting at TC = 11.8 K at ambient pressure, and a pressure of 300 bar drives deuterated κ-(ET)2Cu[N(CN)2]Cl from an antiferromagnetic to a superconducting ground state with a transition temperature of TC = 13.1 K. The following table shows only a few exemplary superconductors of this class. For more superconductors, see Lebed (2008) in the references.

Even more superconductors can be found by changing the ET-molecules slightly either by replacing the sulfur atoms by selenium (BEDT-TSF, BETS) or by oxygen (BEDO-TTF, BEDO).

Some two-dimensional organic superconductors of the κ-(ET)2X and λ(BETS)2X families are candidates for the Fulde-Ferrell-Larkin-Ovchinnikov (FFLO) phase when superconductivity is suppressed by an external magnetic field.

Doped fullerenes
Superconducting fullerenes based on C60 are fairly different from other organic superconductors. The building molecules are no longer manipulated hydrocarbons but pure carbon molecules. In addition these molecules are no longer flat but bulky which gives rise to a three-dimensional, isotropic superconductor. The pure C60 grows in an fcc-lattice and is an insulator. By placing alkali atoms in the interstitials the crystal becomes metallic and eventually superconducting at low temperatures.

Unfortunately C60 crystals are not stable at ambient atmosphere. They are grown and investigated in closed capsules, limiting the measurement techniques possible. The highest transition temperature measured so far was TC = 33 K for Cs2RbC60.The highest measured transition temperature of an organic superconductor was found in 1995 in Cs3C60 pressurized with 15 kbar to be TC = 40 K. Under pressure this compound shows a unique behavior. Usually the highest TC is achieved with the lowest pressure necessary to drive the transition. Further increase of the pressure usually reduces the transition temperature. However, in Cs3C60 superconductivity sets in at very low pressures of several 100 bar, and the transition temperature keeps increasing with increasing pressure. This indicates a completely different mechanism then just broadening of the bandwidth.

More organic superconductors
Next to the three major classes of organic superconductors (SCs) there are more organic systems becoming superconducting at low temperatures or under pressure. A few examples follow.

TTP-based SCs
TMTTF as well as BEDT-TTF are based on the molecule TTF (tetrathiafulvalene). Using TTP (tetrathiapentalene) as basic molecules one receives a variety of new organic molecules serving as cations in organic crystals. And some of them are superconducting. This class of superconductors was only reported recently and investigations are still under process.

Phenanthrene-type SCs
Instead of using sulfated molecules or the fairly big Buckminster fullerenes recently it became possible to synthesize crystals from the hydrocarbon picene and phenanthrene. For AxPhenanthrene, the superconductivity is possible unconventional. Both phenanthrene and picene are called phenanthrene-edge-type polycyclic aromatic hydrocarbon. The increasing number of benzene rings results in higher Tc.

Graphite intercalation SCs
Putting foreign molecules or atoms between hexagon graphite sheets leads to ordered structures and to superconductivity even if neither the foreign molecule or atom nor the graphite layers are metallic. Several stoichiometries have been synthesized using mainly alkali atoms as anions.

Several TCs for unusual SCs

References 

Superconductors
Organic compounds